The Motorola Calgary is an Android-based smartphone by Motorola to be initially distributed  by Verizon Wireless in the United States. Features of the phone include Wi-Fi networking, a 3-megapixel low light capable digital camera, a standard 3.5 mm headphone jack, interchangeable battery, 3.2-inch touchscreen, MicroSDHC support, QWERTY keyboard, and Texas Instruments OMAP 3430 processor. The Motorola Calgary runs version 1.6, codenamed doughnut, of Google's Android operating system. The phone does, however, run the re-branded MOTOBLUR version of Android, instead of providing the Google Experience skin and application stack. The phone could possibly be a more affordable alternative to the Motorola Droid. Recent photos have leaked, having the phone differ largely form the original render, now seen in the colors black and silver, still running MOTOBlur. It is also assumed that Verizon will release it under the name DROID Devour, as their current Android device naming is out into place.

See also
List of Android devices
Galaxy Nexus

Motorola smartphones
Android (operating system) devices
Verizon Wireless
Mobile phones introduced in 2009